is an art director and background artist for many Madhouse Studio and Studio Ghibli anime films. Oga has worked with major directors Hayao Miyazaki, Isao Takahata, Yoshiaki Kawajiri, Osamu Dezaki. He also published two artbooks and directed a short animated film.

Works (selection)

Director
 , 2006

Art director
 The Fantastic Adventures of Unico - (ユニコ Unico), 1979
 Tomorrow's Joe 2 - (あしたのジョー2 Ashita no Jō Tsū), 1980
 Barefoot Gen - (はだしのゲン Hadashi no gen), 1983
 Toki no Tabibito -Time Stranger- - (時空の旅人 Toki no Tabibito), 1986
 Wicked City - (妖獣都市 Yōjū Toshi), 1987
 My Neighbor Totoro - (となりのトトロ Tonari no Totoro), 1988
 Girls in Summer Clothes - (夏服の少女たち Natsufuku no Shōjo-tachi), 1988
 Only Yesterday - (おもひでぽろぽろ Omohide Poro Poro), 1991
 Pom Poko - (平成狸合戦ぽんぽこ Heisei Tanuki Gassen Pon Poko), 1994
 Princess Mononoke - (もののけ姫 Mononoke Hime), 1997
 The Tale of Princess Kaguya - (かぐや姫の物語 Kaguya-hime no Monogatari), 2013

Assistant background art director
 Treasure Island - (宝島 Takarajima), 1978
 Cobra: Space Adventure - (コブラ スペースアドベンチャー Kobura Supēsu Adobenchā), 1982

Background art
 Panda! Go, Panda! and the Rainy-Day Circus - (パンダコパンダ 雨降りサーカスの巻 Panda Kopanda: Amefuri Sākasu no Maki), 1973
 Adventures of Ganba - (ガンバの冒険 Ganba no Bōken), 1975
 Nobody's Boy: Remi - (家なき子 Ie Naki Ko), 1977
 Makoto-chan - (まことちゃん Makoto Chan), 1980
 Harmagedon - (幻魔大戦 Genma Taisen), 1983
 Unico in the Island of Magic - (ユニコ 魔法の島へ Unico: Mahō no Shima e), 1983
 Lensman - (SF 新世紀 レンズマン SF Shinseiki Lensman), 1984
 The Dagger of Kamui - (カムイの剣 Kamui no Ken), 1985
 Barefoot Gen 2 - (はだしのゲン2 Hadashi no Gen 2), 1986
 Hoero! Bun Bun - (ほえろブンブン Hoero! Bun Bun), 1987
 Bride of Deimos - (悪魔の花嫁 蘭の組曲 Akuma no Hanayome - Ran no Kumikyoku), 1988
 Demon City Shinjuku - (魔界都市 新宿 Makai Toshi: Shinjuku), 1988
 Goku: Midnight Eye - (Midnight Eye ゴクウ Midnight Eye Gokū), 1989
 Kiki's Delivery Service - (魔女の宅急便 Majo no Takkyūbin), 1989
 Urusei Yatsura: Always My Darling - (うる星やつら いつだってマイ・ダーリン Urusei Yatsura Itsudatte Mai Dārin), 1991
 Porco Rosso - (紅の豚 Kurenai no Buta), 1992
 Ninja Scroll - (獣兵衛忍風帖 Jūbē Ninpūchō), 1993
 On Your Mark - (オン・ユア・マーク On Yua Māku), 1995
 Whisper of the Heart - (耳をすませば Mimi o Sumaseba), 1995
 Rurouni Kenshin: The Motion Picture - (るろうに剣心 -明治剣客浪漫譚- 維新志士への鎮魂歌 Rurōni Kenshin Meiji Kenkaku Rōmantan Ishin Shishi e no Requiem), 1997
 Vampire Hunter D: Bloodlust - (バンパイアハンターD Banpaia hantâ D), 2000
 Spirited Away - (千と千尋の神隠し Sen to Chihiro no Kamikakushi), 2001
 InuYasha the Movie: Affections Touching Across Time - (映画犬夜叉 時代を越える想い Eiga Inuyasha: Toki o Koeru Omoi), 2001
 The Cat Returns - (猫の恩返し Neko no Ongaeshi), 2002
 Fantastic Children - (ファンタジックチルドレン Fantajikku Chirudoren), 2004
 Howl's Moving Castle - (ハウルの動く城 Hauru no Ugoku Shiro), 2004
 The Girl Who Leapt Through Time - (時をかける少女 Toki o Kakeru Shōjo), 2006
 Tales from Earthsea - (ゲド戦記 Gedo Senki), 2006
 Highlander: The Search for Vengeance 2007
 Ponyo - (崖の上のポニョ Gake no Ue no Ponyo), 2008
 Kawa no Hikari - (川の光 Kawa no Hikari), 2009
 Summer Wars - (サマーウォーズ Samā Wōzu), 2009
 The Secret World of Arrietty - (借りぐらしのアリエッティ Kari-gurashi no Arietti), 2010
 A Letter to Momo - (ももへの手紙 Momo e no Tegami), 2012

Art books
 Kazuo Oga Art Collection (Oga Kazuo Gashuu). Tokuma Shoten, 1996. 
 Kazuo Oga Art Collection II (Oga Kazuo Gashuu II). Tokuma Shoten, 2005.

Exhibition
The Museum of Contemporary Art, in Tokyo, Japan sponsored an exhibition called  Kazuo Oga – The Man Who Drew Totoro's Forest from July 21, 2007 through September 30, 2007.
A documentary about this exhibition "Oga Kazuo Exhibition: Ghibli No Eshokunin - The One Who Painted Totoro's Forest" (ジブリの絵職人　男鹿和雄展　トトロの森を描いた人) was released on DVD and Blu-ray.

Notes

References
 Filmography on Nausicaa.net

External links
 
 
 Kazuo Oga on Ghibli.jp (Japanese)
 Kazuo Oga webpage at Nippon Television
 Ad-net Sakigake Kyo Interview Vol.52 Kazuo Oga (Japanese)

Anime directors
Japanese art directors
Background artists
Studio Ghibli people
1952 births
Living people